The Spade Farm Covered Bridge, also called the Old Hollow Covered Bridge is a covered bridge that crosses a storm drainage ditch off State Route 7 in Ferrisburgh, Vermont.

The bridge is of Town lattice design built by Justin Miller.

Recent history
The Spade Farm Covered Bridge was originally located in North Ferrisburgh, Vermont on Old Hollow Road (hence its other name). In 1958 a local farmer, Sam Spade, asked to have it moved to his farm after it was slated to be dismantled and replaced by a modern bridge.  Despite the sign on the bridge stating a build date of 1824, historians say a date of 1850 is more likely.  The bridge is still privately owned and falling into disrepair since it is no longer available for state or federal funding.  Despite the disrepair, there are numerous examples of period advertising on the truss members.

References

Bridges completed in 1850
Covered bridges in Vermont
Wooden bridges in Vermont
Bridges in Addison County, Vermont
Tourist attractions in Addison County, Vermont
Road bridges in Vermont
Pedestrian bridges in Vermont
Former road bridges in the United States
Lattice truss bridges in the United States
1850 establishments in Vermont
Buildings and structures in Ferrisburgh, Vermont